St. Benedict's Monastery is a Catholic monastery in Pitkin County, Colorado, in the unincorporated community of Snowmass about  northwest of Aspen. The monks are members of the Order of Cistercians of the Strict Observance, commonly called the Trappists.

The monastery protects a large amount of open space in a sensitive area near important wildlife migration routes. The monks manage their ranchlands, operate a cookie bakery, and offer retreat facilities for groups and individuals. A retreat house and guest hermitages are located about 1 mile from the main monastery building.

The monastery was founded in 1956 as a foundation established by the Trappist community at St. Joseph's Abbey in Spencer, Massachusetts. The community celebrated its 50th anniversary in 2006.

St. Benedict's was the home of Father Thomas Keating, a popular writer on Centering Prayer and one of the founders of Contemplative Outreach.

External links
 St. Benedict's Monastery Website
 St. Benedict's Retreat House
 Contemplative Outreach

Trappist monasteries in the United States
20th-century Christian monasteries
1956 establishments in Colorado
Catholic Church in Colorado
Buildings and structures in Pitkin County, Colorado
Tourist attractions in Pitkin County, Colorado
Christian organizations established in 1956